{{DISPLAYTITLE:C22H31NO3}}
The molecular formula C22H31NO3 (molar mass: 357.49 g/mol, exact mass: 357.2304 u) may refer to:

 Epostane
 Oxybutynin

Molecular formulas